Timasitheus or Timesitheus (Gr.  or , fl. 4th century BC) was a citizen of Trapezus, and a proxenus of the Mossynoeci, between whom and the Cyrean Greeks he acted as interpreter, when the latter wished to make a treaty with the barbarians, and to obtain a passage through their country.

References

People from Trapezus
4th-century BC Greek people
Proxenoi
Anabasis (Xenophon)